G-Jet s.r.o., formerly known as Grossmann Jet Service, is a private jet operator based in Prague, Czech Republic. The company provides executive charter services, as well as aircraft management and brokerage. Its main base is Vaclav Havel Airport, Prague.,  The company slogan is Excellence in every detail.

History 
G-Jet was set up in 2004. The company offers executive charter flights all around the world, aircraft management, brokerage and consultancy.

Fleet 
G-Jet fleet includes the following aircraft (as of December 2012):

 1 × Hawker 900XP, max 8 passengers OK-KAZ
 1 × Gulfstream 550, max 13 passengers OK-KKF

References 

 (registration required)

External links

Airlines of the Czech Republic
Airlines established in 2004
Charter airlines
Czech companies established in 2004